Borris-in-Ossory–Kilcotton GAA is a Gaelic Athletic Association hurling club in County Laois, Ireland. The club colours are green, red, and white.

History
The club was created in late 2010 by the complete amalgamation at all levels of hurling of neighbouring clubs Borris-in-Ossory and Kilcotton.

The club won the 2016 Laois Senior Hurling Championship drawing with Rathdowney-Errill 2-26 to 2-26 before winning the replay 1-18 to 2-10.

Both the Borris-in-Ossory and Kilcotton clubs remain as separate football clubs competing in the Laois Junior 'C' Football Championship.

Achievements
 Laois Senior Hurling Championship: (1) 2016
 Laois Intermediate Hurling Championship: (2) 2012 and 2014

References

Gaelic games clubs in County Laois
Hurling clubs in County Laois